is a Tokimeki Memorial Girl's Side themed Taisen Puzzle-Dama spin-off game released for Mobile Phones in December 2004 in Japan, following Tokimeki Memorial Taisen Puzzle Dama and Tokimeki Memorial 2 Puzzle-Dama.

2004 video games
Mobile games
Puzzle video games
Konami games
Japan-exclusive video games
Tokimeki Memorial
Video games developed in Japan